The Eurovision Young Musicians 2022 was the twentieth edition of the Eurovision Young Musicians. It took place at the Corum in Montpellier on 23 July 2022. The live show was hosted by French playwright Judith Chaine and Belgian radio presenter Vincent Delbushaye, with the Montpellier Occitanie National Opera Orchestra conducted by Pierre Dumoussaud. Organised by the European Broadcasting Union (EBU), this edition was co-hosted by French broadcasters Radio France and France Télévisions, as part of a summer series of music events called Festival Radio France Occitanie Montpellier.

Musicians representing nine countries with EBU membership participated in the contest, with Austria and host country France returning. Eleven countries, namely Albania, Estonia, Greece, Hungary, Israel, Malta, Russia, San Marino, Slovenia, Spain and the United Kingdom, decided to not participate in this edition after having taken part in the previous contest in 2018. Although initially not included on the list of participants, it was later revealed that Croatia would still take part. The winner was the Czech Republic, represented by musician Daniel Matejča, marking the country's first win in the competition and at any Eurovision event since Eurovision Young Dancers 2003.

Location 

A 2020 contest was initially planned to take place in Zagreb, Croatia on 21 June to coincide with World Music Day, however, it was postponed indefinitely as a result of the COVID-19 pandemic. The future of the contest remained uncertain until 3 February 2022 when the Norwegian broadcaster NRK and later the Belgian broadcaster RTBF confirmed that the upcoming edition would be held in Montpellier, France on 23 July 2022.
The event took place during the annual summer festival, Festival Radio France Occitanie Montpellier, and this was the first time that France had hosted the contest. The selected venue was the Corum, a building that houses both a conference centre and an opera house (Opéra Berlioz), and is located in the centre of the city in southern France. The last time that France hosted a Eurovision event was the Junior Eurovision Song Contest 2021 in Paris.

Format

Presenters
On 28 March 2022, the Culturebox channel announced on social networks that the playwright Judith Chaine would be the presenter of the twentieth edition of the competition. She is known for having presented the Musiques en fête since 2018, alongside Cyril Féraud and the Victoires de la musique classique since 2019 and has worked for radio station France Musique since 2007. On 26 June 2022, it was announced that Vincent Delbushaye would join as co-host of the competition. Belgian-born Delbushaye is a radio presenter for Musiq'3, the classical radio station of French-language broadcaster RTBF.

Jury members 
On 5 July 2022, France Télévisions announced the jurors of the competition. The jurors for the final are Lithuanian pianist and chair of the jury Mūza Rubackytė, Swiss oboist Nora Cismondi, director of the Festival Radio France Montpellier Jean-Pierre Rousseau, French cellist Christian-Pierre La Marca, and Albanian violinist Tedi Papavrami.

Participants and results
For a country to be eligible for potential participation in the Eurovision Young Musicians, it must be an active member of the European Broadcasting Union (EBU). Nine countries participated in the competition, the lowest number since 1984. Of the participants, Austria and France returned after being absent the previous edition, while 11 nations that had participated in the last edition did not return this year. Non-returning countries included Albania, Estonia, Greece, Hungary, Israel, Malta, Russia, San Marino, Slovenia, Spain and United Kingdom. The winner of the event was the Czech Republic with Daniel Matejča's violin performance of the 3rd and 4th mvt from Violin Concerto No. 1 by D. Shostakovich.

Broadcasting
The following countries, listed in order of broadcasting dates, confirmed that they would broadcast the contest along with the dates of broadcasting schedules.

References

External links 

 

2022 in music
2022 in France
Eurovision Young Musicians by year
Events in France
July 2022 events in Europe
Music events postponed due to the COVID-19 pandemic